Beloved Jim is a lost 1917 American silent drama film produced and released by Universal Film Manufacturing Company. It was directed by Stuart Paton and starred Priscilla Dean.

Cast
Harry Carter as 'Beloved' Jim Brockton
Priscilla Dean as Mary, His Wife
J. Morris Foster as Donald, His Nephew
Charles Hill Mailes as Robert McGregor
Frank Deshon as Fritz Hahn
Sydney Deane as Lawrence Darcy
J. Edwin Brown as The Butler
Joseph W. Girard as The Derelict
Mattie Witting as Housekeeper

Reception
Like many American films of the time, Beloved Jim was subject to cuts by city and state film censorship boards. The Chicago Board of Censors cut the four intertitles "My aunt surely picked a good wife", "And then Jim need never know", "You beast, I love Jim" etc., and "He was not man enough to admit defeat, but boasted of his conquest".

References

External links

 allmovie/synopsis; Beloved Jim

1917 films
American silent feature films
Lost American films
1917 drama films
American black-and-white films
Silent American drama films
1917 lost films
Lost drama films
Films directed by Stuart Paton
1910s American films